Chinnapattakadu is a village in the Ariyalur taluk of Ariyalur district, Tamil Nadu, India.

Demographics 

 census, Chinnapattakadu had a total population of 2417 with 1228 males and 1189 females.

References 

Villages in Ariyalur district